Information quality (InfoQ) is the potential of a data set to achieve a specific (scientific or practical) goal using a given empirical analysis method.

Definition 
Formally, the definition is InfoQ = U(X,f|g) where X is the data, f the analysis method, g the goal and U the utility function. InfoQ is different from data quality and analysis quality, but is dependent on these components and on the relationship between them. 
   	
InfoQ has been applied in a wide range of domains like healthcare, customer surveys, data science programs, advanced manufacturing and Bayesian network applications.

Kenett and Shmueli (2014) proposed eight dimensions to help assess InfoQ and various methods for increasing InfoQ: Data resolution, Data structure, Data integration, Temporal relevance, Chronology of data and goal, Generalization, Operationalization, Communication.

References

Data
Research methods
Statistical analysis
Information